Bisio may refer to:

People
Angelo Bollano Bisio (1918–1978), Italian footballer
Claudio Bisio (born 1957), Italian actor, presenter, voice actor, comedian and writer
Enrico Bisio (born 1934), Italian former field hockey player
Michael Bisio (born 1955), American jazz double bass player, composer and bandleader

Other
Francavilla Bisio, comune (municipality) in the Province of Alessandria in the Italian region Piedmont